Etan Kalil Patz (October 9, 1972 – May 25, 1979) was an American boy who was six years old on May 25, 1979, when he disappeared on his way to his school bus stop in the SoHo neighborhood of Lower Manhattan. His disappearance helped launch the missing children movement, which included new legislation and new methods for tracking down missing children. Several years after he disappeared, Patz was one of the first children to be profiled on the "photo on a milk carton" campaigns of the early 1980s. In 1983, President Ronald Reagan designated May 25—the anniversary of Etan's disappearance—as National Missing Children's Day in the United States.

Decades later, it was determined that Patz had been abducted and murdered the same day that he went missing. The case was reopened in 2010 by the Manhattan District Attorney's office. In 2012, the FBI excavated the basement of the alleged crime scene near the Patz residence but discovered no new evidence. Pedro Hernandez—a suspect who confessed—was charged and indicted later that year on charges of second-degree murder and first-degree kidnapping. In 2014, the case went through a series of hearings to determine whether or not Hernandez's statements before he received his Miranda rights were legally admissible at trial. His trial began in January 2015 and it ended with a mistrial that May, when 1 of the 12 jurors held out. The retrial began on October 19, 2016, and it was concluded on February 14, 2017, after nine days of deliberations, when the jury found Hernandez guilty of murder and kidnapping. Hernandez was sentenced to 25-years-to-life in prison on April 18, 2017. Hernandez will not be eligible for parole for 25 years.

Disappearance
On the morning of May 25, 1979, Etan left his SoHo apartment at 113 Prince Street by himself for the first time, planning to walk two blocks to board a school bus at West Broadway and Prince Street. He was wearing a black "Future Flight Captain" pilot cap, a blue corduroy jacket, blue jeans and blue sneakers with fluorescent stripes. He never got on the bus.

At school, Etan's teacher noticed his absence but did not report it to the principal. When Etan did not return home after school, his mother Julie called the police. At first, detectives considered the Patzes to be possible suspects but quickly determined they had no involvement. An intense search began that evening, using nearly 100 police officers and a team of bloodhounds. The search continued for weeks. Neighbors and police canvassed the city and placed missing-child posters featuring Etan's portrait, but this resulted in few leads.

Etan's father Stanley was a professional photographer and had a collection of photographs he had taken of his son. His photos of Etan were printed on countless missing-child posters and milk cartons. They were also projected on screens in Times Square.

Accusations against Jose Ramos
Assistant United States Attorney Stuart R. GraBois received the case in 1985 and identified Jose Antonio Ramos, a convicted child sexual abuser who had been a friend of Etan's former babysitters, as the primary suspect. In 1982, multiple boys had accused Ramos of trying to lure them into a drain pipe in the area where Ramos was living. When police searched the drain pipe, they found photographs of Ramos and young boys who resembled Etan. GraBois eventually found out that Ramos had been in custody in Pennsylvania in connection with an unrelated child molestation case. In 1990, GraBois was deputized as a deputy state attorney general in Pennsylvania to help prosecute a case against Ramos for sexually abusing children and to obtain further information about Etan's case. When first questioned by GraBois, Ramos stated that, on the day when Etan disappeared, he had taken a young boy back to his apartment to rape him. Ramos said that he was "90 percent sure" it was the boy whom he later saw on television. However, Ramos did not use Etan's name. He also claimed he had put the boy on a subway going uptown.

In 1991, while Ramos was incarcerated, a jailhouse informant told GraBois and FBI agent Mary Galligan that Ramos had told him he knew what had happened to Etan. Ramos even drew a map of Etan's school bus route, indicating that he knew that Etan's bus stop was the third one on the route. In a special feature on missing children, the New York Post reported on October 21, 1999, that Ramos was the prime suspect in Etan's disappearance. Ramos had been known by the Patz family and was the prime suspect all along, but in the early 1980s authorities were unable to prosecute Ramos.

Etan's body was never found, and he was declared legally dead on June 19, 2001. Stan and Julie Patz pursued and won a civil case against Ramos in 2004. They were awarded a symbolic sum of $2 million, which they have never collected. Ramos has never been criminally prosecuted for the murder of Etan. Every year, on Etan's birthday and the anniversary of his disappearance, Stan Patz sent Ramos a copy of his son's missing-child poster. On the back, he typed the same message: "What did you do to my little boy?"

Ramos has denied that he killed Etan. Ramos served a 20-year prison sentence in the State Correctional Institution in Dallas, Pennsylvania, for child molestation. He was released from prison on November 7, 2012. Soon after his release he was arrested on a Megan's Law violation.

Stan and Julie Patz had the 2004 judgment against Ramos dismissed after the 2015 trial of Pedro Hernandez convinced them that Ramos was not responsible for their son's death.

Case reopened
Manhattan district attorney Cyrus Vance, Jr. officially reopened the case on May 25, 2010. On April 19, 2012, Federal Bureau of Investigation (FBI) and New York City Police Department (NYPD) investigators began excavating the SoHo basement of 127-B Prince Street, near the Patz home. This residence had been newly refurbished shortly after Etan's disappearance in 1979, and the basement had been the workshop and storage space of a handyman. After a four-day search, investigators announced that there was "nothing conclusive found."

Confession
On May 24, 2012, New York police commissioner Raymond Kelly announced that a man was in custody who had implicated himself in Etan's disappearance. A law enforcement official identified the man as 51-year-old Pedro Hernandez of Maple Shade, New Jersey, and said that Hernandez had confessed to strangling the child. Hernandez stated in his written confession to police, "I’m sorry, I shoke [sic] him." According to a 2009 book about the case, After Etan, Etan had a dollar and had told his parents that he planned to buy a soda to drink with his lunch. At the time of Etan's disappearance, Hernandez was an 18-year-old convenience store worker in a neighborhood bodega. Hernandez said that he later threw Etan's remains into the garbage. Hernandez was charged with second-degree murder. According to a New York Times report from May 25, 2012, the police at that time had no physical evidence to corroborate his confession.

Corroborating evidence
In 2012 Jose Lopez, a man from New Jersey, reached out to investigators because he believed that Hernandez, Lopez's brother-in-law, was responsible for Etan's disappearance. Statements by Hernandez's sister, Nina Hernandez, and Tomas Rivera, leader of a Charismatic Christianity group at St. Anthony of Padua, a Roman Catholic church in Camden, New Jersey, indicated that Hernandez may have publicly confessed in the presence of fellow parishioners in the early 1980s to having murdered Etan. According to Hernandez's sister, it was an "open family secret that he had confessed in the church." 

A New York grand jury indicted Hernandez on November 14, 2012, on charges of second-degree murder and first-degree kidnapping. His lawyer has stated that Hernandez was diagnosed with schizotypal personality disorder, which includes hallucinations. The lawyer has also said that Hernandez has a low intelligence quotient (IQ) of around 70, "at the border of intellectual disability."

Trials and conviction
On December 12, 2012, Hernandez pled not guilty to two counts of murder and one count of kidnapping in a New York court. In April 2013, Harvey Fishbein, Hernandez's legal-aid criminal-defense lawyer, filed a motion to dismiss the case, citing that Hernandez's "confession in one of the nation's most notorious child disappearances was false, peppered with questionable claims and made after almost seven hours of police questioning." The next month, New York Supreme Court justice Maxwell Wiley ruled that the evidence was "legally sufficient to support the charges" and that the case could move forward. He also ordered a hearing to determine whether the defendant's statements could be used at trial.

A September 2014 hearing was conducted to determine whether Hernandez's statements that were made before the police had read the Miranda rights to him were legally admissible at trial. This would be influenced by whether he felt free to leave during the time before which he was Mirandized. The hearing also sought to determine whether Hernandez understood the significance of his Miranda rights and was competent to waive them when he did so. This was significant because it would decide whether any statements made after that point by Hernandez were legally admissible at trial. The actual truth or falsehood of the statements was not the focus of the hearing; rather, the question of the statements' truthfulness was to be discussed at trial, which began on January 5, 2015.

The case resulted in a mistrial in May 2015 because of a hung jury that was deadlocked 11 against 1 for conviction. A retrial began on October 19, 2016, in a New York City court, with jury deliberations in February 2017. On February 14, 2017, Hernandez was found guilty of kidnapping and felony murder. Sentencing was scheduled on February 28, with Hernandez facing 25 years to life in prison. However, Hernandez's attorneys were granted a delay in order to challenge the verdict, and no new sentencing date was set.

On April 18, 2017, Hernandez was sentenced to life in prison with the possibility of parole after serving at least 25 years.

Aftermath
In 1983, the May 25 anniversary of Etan Patz's disappearance was designated National Missing Children's Day in the United States. In 2001, the tribute spread worldwide. The International Centre for Missing & Exploited Children (ICMEC) coordinates the "Help Bring Them Home" campaign in 22 countries in conjunction with International Missing Children's Day.

The extensive media attention attracted by the case of Patz's disappearance has been credited with increasing public awareness of the problem of child abduction. As a result, fewer parents are willing to allow their children to walk to school, photos of missing children have been more widely distributed (for example, on milk cartons) and the concept of "stranger danger" has been promoted, the idea that all adults not known to the child must be regarded as potential sources of danger.

See also
 Crime in New York City
 List of murder convictions without a body
 List of solved missing person cases

Notes

References

Further reading

External links
 Help Us Find Them - National Missing Children's Day 2015
 

1970s missing person cases
1979 in New York City
American Jews
Incidents of violence against boys
American murder victims
May 1979 events in the United States
Missing person cases in New York City
Murder convictions without a body
1970s crimes in New York City
1979 murders in the United States
1970s in Manhattan